Dzhaglargi (Ƶaġlargi) is a village (selo) in Kurchaloyevsky District, Chechnya.

Administrative and municipal status 
Municipally, Dzhaglargi is incorporated into Regitinskoye rural settlement. It is one of four settlements included in it.

Geography 

Dzhaglargi is located in the upper reaches of the Khumys and Morzhaterling rivers.

The nearest settlements to Dzhaglargi are the city of Kurchaloy in the north, Khidi-Khutor in the east, Regita in the south-east, Marzoy-Mokhk in the south, and Niki-Khita in the west.

History 
In 1944, after the genocide and deportation of the Chechen and Ingush people and the Chechen-Ingush ASSR was abolished, the village of Dzhaglargi was renamed and settled by people from the neighbouring republic of Dagestan.

In 1958, after the Vaynakh people returned and the Chechen-Ingush ASSR was restored, the village regained its old Chechen name, Dzhaglargi.

Population 
 2002 Census: 280
 2010 Census: 511

According to the 2010 Census, the majority of residents of Dzhaglargi were ethnic Chechens.

References 

Rural localities in Kurchaloyevsky District